Nicola Lazzari is a contemporary violin maker. He lives in Cremona, Italy currently and has won copious international competitions for his workmanship. His work is clean with a rather Stradivarius-like shape. Varnish shows off a deep, rich reddish color with little visible signs of toolmarks.

References

External links
 Official web site

Living people
1961 births
Bowed string instrument makers
Italian musical instrument makers
People from Cremona